The Circuito Lasarte was an  Grand Prix motor racing road course at Lasarte-Oria, Guipúzcoa, Spain in the Basque Country near the city of San Sebastián on the Bay of Biscay. The counterclockwise layout was used between 1923 and 1935 but racing ended with the eruption of the Spanish Civil War in 1936 and after the war auto racing resumed at new tracks near Barcelona.

The Circuito Lasarte played host to the San Sebastian Grand Prix, Spanish Grand Prix and the 1926 European Grand Prix. No longer operational for auto racing, in 1965 the layout was used for the World Cycling Championship.

Grand Prix results

San Sebastian Grand Prix

1923 Albert Guyot driving a Rolland-Pilain
1924 Henry Segrave driving a Sunbeam
1925 Albert Divo/André Morel driving a Delage 2LCV

European Grand Prix

1926 Jules Goux driving a Bugatti T39A

Spanish Grand Prix

1926 Bartolomeo Costantini driving a Bugatti T35
1927 Robert Benoist driving a Delage 15-S8

San Sebastian Grand Prix

1927 Emilio Materassi driving a Bugatti T35C
1928 Louis Chiron driving a Bugatti T35C
1929 Louis Chiron driving a Bugatti T35B
1930 Achille Varzi driving a Maserati 26M

Spanish Grand Prix

1933 Louis Chiron driving an Alfa Romeo Type B/P3
1934 Luigi Fagioli driving a Mercedes-Benz W25/34
1935 Rudolf Caracciola driving a Mercedes-Benz W25/35

References
The Golden Age by Leif Snellman 
Lasarte auto racing photos

Lasarte
Motorsport venues in the Basque Country (autonomous community)
Sports venues in the Basque Country (autonomous community)
Defunct motorsport venues in Spain
Spanish Grand Prix